Phuang malai or malai are a Thai form of floral garland.  They are often given as offerings or kept for good luck.

Origins 
Phuang malai may be derived from the Tamil word poo maalai which has the same meaning poo (flowers), maalai (garland). There are historical evidence that Chola kings from Tamil Nadu (South India) had captured what is currently part of Thailand, Java and Sumatra, Indonesia, and Sri Lanka. Rock inscriptions have mentions about these victories. The Tamils are skillful garland makers and in Tamil culture from birth to death every special event in a person's life is celebrated with flowers especially garlands. Chola kings built huge temples all over Tamil Nadu. Cholan was referred to as Chulalongarn.

The first record of phuang malai was found during the reign of King Chulalongkorn. There was a literary work written by the king called Phra Ratchaphithi Sip Song Duean ('Twelve-Months Royal Ceremonies') which contained information about events and ceremonies in the Sukhothai Kingdom. In the 4th month ceremony, it was mentioned that fresh flower garlands were made by the king's chief concubine Thao Sichulalak (ท้าวศรีจุฬาลักษณ์). Then, in the Rattanakosin Kingdom the phuang malai became an important ornamental object in every ceremony. Every girl in the palace was expected to acquire the skills of making phuang malai. Queen Saovabha Phongsri devised a wide variety of intricate phuang malai patterns.

Patterns 
Phuang malai patterns can be divided into six groups.

Creature malai resembles animals. Flowers are arranged into animal shapes such as mouse, rabbit, squirrel, and gibbon.
Chained malai is a series of rounded malai connected together which resemble a chain. 
Braided malai two rounded malai connected together, decorated with pine-shaped malai on each end.
Vine malai is a series of semicircular malai arranged in a vine shape.
Laced malai is a malai fully decorated by inserting golden and silver laces all over the malai both inside and out.
Orchid malai is made only from orchids.

Uses 
Phuang malai can be classified into three categories by use.

Malai chai diao is usually used as an offering to show respect. In temples and cemeteries, these malai can be seen hanging from the hands of Buddhist monk statues along with votive candles. Chained malai and braided malai are examples of malai chai diao.
Malai song chai is usually draped around a person's neck to show importance. In the Thai wedding ceremony, both bride and groom often wear malai song chai. 
Malai chamruai or souvenir malai, the smallest form of malai, is usually given as a souvenir to a large group of people. These malai are customarily given by a host, for instance, in wedding ceremonies, housewarming ceremonies, birthday parties, and baby showers. Creature malai is one form of malai chamruai. The purpose of malai chamruai is similar to that of lei (garland) in Hawaiian culture.

In addition to the use of the malai as offerings, gifts, and souvenirs, malai have many more functions. They can be used to decorate throne halls and houses. Malai can also be hung on Thai musical instruments to pay respect to the masters of those instruments and for good luck and success in a performance.

Bamboo garlands
Thai bamboo garlands are decorative woven offerings sometimes used as a substitute for floral garlands and as a way to hang other offerings. Bamboo garlands are part of the tradition of Phu Thai people in the village of Kut Wa in Kuchinarai District, Kalasin Province, in the northeast of Thailand. Bamboo garlands are also used in the festival of Buddhist Lent during the Thai rainy season, called "Bun Khao Pradap Din" or "Bun Phuang Malai Ban Kut Wa".

Bamboo garland ceremony, Kut Wa, Thailand
To celebrate Phu Thai, the villagers of Kut Wa create ornate garlands and form a procession around Wat Kok to display their handiwork, with dancing, singing, and rhythmic drumming.

See also

 Buddhist prayer beads
 Hindu prayer beads
 Mala, used in India
 Lei (garland) 
 Namaste
 Pranāma

References

External links
 Phuang malai at ThailandLife.com (archived 14 May 2008)

Thai culture
Handicrafts